In Roman mythology, Dies  (Latin diēs "day") was the personification of day. She was the daughter of Chaos and Caligo (Mist), and the counterpart of the Greek goddess Hemera.

Family 
According to the Roman mythographer Hyginus, Chaos and Caligine were the parents of Nox (Night), Dies, Erebus (Darkness), and Aether. Cicero says that Aether and Dies were the parents of Caelus (Sky). While, Hyginus says that, in addition to  Caelus, Aether and Dies were also the parents of Terra (Earth), and Mare (Sea). Cicero also says that  Dies and Caelus were the parents of Mercury, the Roman counterpart of Hermes.

Name 
The Latin noun diēs is based on the Proto-Italic accusative singular *dijēm, itself stemming from the Proto-Indo-European root *dyeu-, denoting the "diurnal sky" or the "brightness of the day" (in contrast to the darkness of the night). The corresponding Proto-Indo-European day god is *Dyeus.

See also 
 Dies lustricus

Notes

References 

 Cicero, Marcus Tullius, De Natura Deorum in Cicero: On the Nature of the Gods. Academics, translated by H. Rackham, Loeb Classical Library No. 268, Cambridge, Massachusetts, Harvard University Press, first published 1933, revised 1951. . Online version at Harvard University Press.  Internet Archive.
 Hyginus, Gaius Julius, Fabulae in Apollodorus' Library and Hyginus' Fabulae: Two Handbooks of Greek Mythology, Translated, with Introductions by R. Scott Smith and Stephen M. Trzaskoma, Hackett Publishing Company,  2007. .

External links

Roman goddesses
Day